Sant'Andrea is a baroque-style, Roman Catholic church in the town of Pioltello, region of Lombardy, Italy.

History
The church we see now was mainly erected in the 16th century, but has undergone substantial modifications over the centuries. A church at the site existed by the 13th century. A main reconstruction and expansion occurred during 1742-1745, when the façade and bell-tower were refurbished under the designs of Carlo Giuseppe Merlo. The chapels of the Rosary and of St Francis of Paola were decorated in the 18th century. 

Later additions were frescoes by Giovanni Valtorta; Romeo and Paolo Rivetta; the brothers Rino; and Federico Bertini.

References

Churches in the metropolitan city of Milan
Baroque church buildings in Lombardy
Roman Catholic churches completed in 1745
18th-century Roman Catholic church buildings in Italy
Pioltello